The women's 4 × 400 metres relay at the 2021 World Athletics Relays was held at Silesian Stadium on 1 and 2 May.

Records 
Prior to the competition, the records were as follows:

Results

Heats 
Qualification: First 2 of each heat (Q) plus the 2 fastest times (q) advanced to the final.

Final

References 

2021 World Athletics Relays
4 × 400 metres relay
Relays